The Slave Trade Act 1824 is an Act of the Parliament of the United Kingdom to "amend and consolidate the Laws relating to the Abolition of the Slave Trade".

Section 9 of this Act created a capital offence. The sentence was reduced to transportation for life by section 1 of the Punishment of Offences Act 1837.

See also 
 Slave Trade Acts
 Slave Trade Act 1788
 Slave Trade Act 1807
 Slavery Abolition Act 1833
 Slave Trade Act 1843
 Slave Trade Act 1873

References

External links 
 Text of the Slave Trade Act 1824
 Commentary on the Slave Trade Act 1824 by the Anti-Slavery Society

1824 in British law
Abolitionism in the United Kingdom
United Kingdom Acts of Parliament 1824
Slave trade legislation